Albert Curtis Henderson (January 27, 1917 – June 10, 2006) was an American professional basketball player. He played in the National Basketball League for the Detroit Gems in the 1946–47 and averaged 1.0 points per game.

References 

1917 births
2006 deaths
American men's basketball players
Basketball players from Illinois
Detroit Gems players
Guards (basketball)
People from Effingham County, Illinois